Zunic is a surname. Notable people with the surname include:

Dragiša Žunić (born 1978), Serbian footballer
Enrica Zunic', Italian writer
Ivica Žunić (born 1988), Croatian footballer
Jordan Zunic (born 1991), Australian golfer
Matt Zunic (1919–2006), American basketball player and coach
Stipe Žunić (born 1990), Croatian athlete